Titus Verginius Tricostus Rutilus (died 463 BC), was consul of the Roman Republic in 479 BC.  He held the office with Caeso Fabius Vibulanus.

According to Livy, he was assigned the war with the Veientes, but because of his temerity his army was almost cut off, saved only by his colleague Fabius, marching from fighting the Aequi.

At an unknown point in his career he was elected to the priesthood of the augurs. Verginius died in 463 BC during a pestilence that claimed, among others, both the consuls for that year.

His filiation suggests his father was Opiter Verginius Tricostus (consul in 502 BC) and that his brothers were Proculus Verginius Tricostus Rutilus (consul in 486 BC) and Aulus Verginius Tricostus Rutilus (consul in 476 BC), and possibly also Opiter Verginius Tricostus Esquilinus (suffect consul in 478 BC and possibly consul in 473 BC).

References 

5th-century BC Roman consuls
Year of birth unknown
Tricostus Rutilus, Titus
463 BC deaths